The women's javelin throw at the 2011 IPC Athletics World Championships was held at the QEII Stadium from 24–28 January

Medalists

F13
The Women's javelin throw, F13 was held on January 24 with the medal ceremony on January 25

Classification F13 - visual impairment
F12: may recognise the shape of a hand and have a visual acuity of 2/60 and/or visual field of less than 5 degrees.
F13: visual acuity ranges from 2/60 to 6/60 and/or visual field over 5 degrees and less than 20 degrees.

Results

Final

Key:   WR = World Record, CR = Championship Record

F33/34/52/53
The Women's javelin throw, F33/34/52/53 was held on January 28

Classification F33/34/52/53
F33: some degree of trunk movement when pushing a wheelchair, limited forward trunk movement during forceful pushing. Throwing movements mainly from the arm. Compete in a wheelchair or from a throwing frame.
F34: good functional strength, minimal limitation or control problems in arms or trunk. Compete in a wheelchair or from a throwing frame.
F52: good shoulder, elbow and wrist function, poor to normal finger flexion and extension, no trunk or leg function.
F53: normal upper limb function, no abdominal, leg or lower spinal function.

Results

Final

Key:   WR = World Record, AR = Area Record, NM = No Mark

F38
The Women's javelin throw, F38 was held on January 26

Classification F38 - meet the minimum disability criteria for athletes with cerebral palsy, head injury or stroke, a limitation in function that impacts sports performance.

Results

Final

Key:   CR = Championship Record, AR = Area Record

F46
The Women's javelin throw, F46 was held on January 28

Classification F46 - single above or below elbow amputation or equivalent impairment.

Results

Final

Key:   CR = Championship Record

F54/55/56
The Women's javelin throw, F54/55/56 was held on January 27

Classification F54/55/56
F54 - normal upper limb function, no abdominal or lower spinal function.
F55 - normal upper limb function, may have partial to almost normal trunk function, no leg function.
F56 - normal upper limb and trunk function, some leg function, may have high bilateral above knee amputation.

Results

Final

Key:   WR = World Record, SB = Season Best, AR = Area Record

F57/58
The Women's javelin throw, F57/58 was held on January 25

Classification F57/58
F57: normal upper limb and trunk function, may have bilateral above knee amputations.
F58: normal upper limb and trunk function, bilateral below knee amputation or single above knee amputation.

Results

Final

Key:   WR = World Record, SB = Season Best, AR = Area Record

See also
List of IPC world records in athletics

References
General
Schedule and results, Official site of the 2011 IPC Athletics World Championships
IPC Athletics Classification Explained, Scottish Disability Sport
Specific

Javelin throw
2011 in women's athletics
Javelin throw at the World Para Athletics Championships